The Type 072A landing ship (NATO/OSD Yuting II-class landing ship tank) is a class of amphibious warfare ship in the Chinese People's Liberation Army Navy.

The Type 072A is a development of the Type 072II or Type 072III landing ships. A tunnel through the superstructure connects the forward and rear decks. The vehicle deck runs the full length of the ship with bow doors and stern ramp.

The first nine ships entered service from 2003 to 2005. They were completed with a twin 37mm turret.

A second batch - reportedly of four ships from Wuchang shipyard and two from Fujian shipyard - began entering service in 2015. The 37mm guns were replaced by a H/PJ-17 30 mm gun.

Ships of the class

See also
Type 072III
Type 072II

References

 
Amphibious warfare vessel classes
Amphibious warfare vessels of the People's Liberation Army Navy